Cristo Rey is a statue on top of Cerro del Cubilete, ('Dice Cup Hill'), a  mountain in Silao Municipality in Guanajuato, Mexico.

Description
Cerro del Cubilete is one of the most historically important religious shrines in Mexico and marks the country's geographical center. The current structure and base for the  statue was created by artist Nicholas Mariscal in 1944 to honour the struggle of the Cristeros.

In the words of former Mexican President Vicente Fox, the statue serves as a "rebuke to the suppressors of religious freedom" who sought to quash the Church during the persecution of Christians in Mexico during the first half of the twentieth century.

Located 20 kilometers from Silao and 30 kilometers from León. It has a height of 2579 meters above sea level, 150 meters more than Machu Picchu in Peru.

History
In Silao, the bishop Valverde y Téllez was the promoter of the monument construction project and petitioner of the authorization. This was achieved, thanks to the remoteness of the moderate constituent of religious and governmental radicalism prevailing in that historical moment.

Shortly after the bishop Valverde y Téllez celebrated a mass on the hill, the priest Eleuterio de María Santísima Ferrer promoted to place a commemorative plaque, the idea was consolidated to also add an image of the Sacred Heart. The project was accepted by the bishop who attended the place on March 12, 1920 to lay the first stone and on April 11 to celebrate the first dedication.

The site was originally occupied by a smaller statue of Jesus, Christ the King. It was destroyed in 1928 by the anti-religious (and particularly anti-Catholic) regime of President Plutarco Elías Calles, as part of his mission to kill Christian rebels and destroy all Christian symbols during the nation's critical "Cristero War" when state atheism was enforced. The current installation was completed in 1950.

Design

Both the building at Cerro del Cubilete and the statue of Christ follow the style known as art deco. The current building serves as the basis for the gigantic statue which measures 20 meters and weighs 80 tons being this statue of Christ the biggest in the world made of bronze and not concrete or marble like those of other sites.

Inside, an altar sits on a circular platform of three steps. A symbolic royal crown hangs above the altar, suspended in a large polished metal dome. Natural light filters through carved slots in the fine marble walls, creating a mystical glow.

The outside of the large, ribbed dome serves as the base of the newer statue, also named "Christ the King". Its arms are open, with angels kneeling at either side - one holding the crown of thorns, the other a royal crown.

At the foot of the statue of Christ the King, is the modern basilica shaped like a globe. The Sanctuary has the capacity to accommodate a large number of pilgrims who attend all year round, but in particular for the feast of Christ the King, the last Sunday of the liturgical year, during the month of November.

In popular culture
The sanctuary of Christ is one of the most visited in Mexico, after the Basilica of Our Lady of Guadalupe and Cathedral Basilica of San Juan de los Lagos. José Alfredo Jiménez mentions the Christ and the mountain in his song “Caminos de Guanajuato” (Roads of Guanajuato).

A mass is celebrated every January 5 in the churchyard, where thousands of riders usually go with their banners, representing their villages. 
Also, a representation is made of the Biblical Magi and the baby Jesus.

Also, every first Sunday of October the Monument to Christ the King is visited by thousands of pilgrims or faithful coming mainly from the cities of León, Irapuato, Celaya, Mexico City; and of the states of Michoacán, Jalisco, Aguascalientes, Querétaro, San Luis Potosí, Hidalgo, Zacatecas, Estado de México, Tlaxcala, Puebla, among others.

To reach the place one most go by means of a cobbled road that surrounds the hill until you reach an upper roundabout, which functions as a viewing point.

See also
 List of statues of Jesus
 List of tallest statues
 Christ the King (Świebodzin)
 Cristo Rey (Colombian statue)
 Cristo de las Noas in Mexico
 Christ the Redeemer in Brazil
 Christ the King (Almada) in Portugal
 Cristo de la Concordia in Bolivia
 Christ of Havana

References

Colossal statues of Jesus
Mountain monuments and memorials
Monuments and memorials in Mexico
Religious buildings and structures completed in 1944
1944 sculptures
Buildings and structures in Guanajuato
Tourist attractions in Guanajuato